Rama Krishna Raju Pettai, also known as R K Pet, is a Panchayat in RK Pet taluk, Tiruvallur district, India.
About Rama Krishna Raju Pettai :
A village is a clustered human settlement or community, larger than a hamlet but smaller than a town, Rama Krishna Raju Pettai Located between Tiruthani and Sholingur This is main village to connect three major different state of cities like Chennai (Tamil Nadu), Bangalore (Karnataka) and Tirupati (Andhra Pradesh). You can visit the trip from here, where you want to go.
Features :
 Government hospital
 Government veterinary hospital 
 Electricity board office
 E sevai portal 
 VAO office
 Taluk office
 Indian bank
 Marriage halls
Milk Society

Zamindari 
RK Pet (along with Valkanampudi) was under the Zamindari of the Karlapati family headed by the Zamindarini Karlapati Shayamalambha Devi. The Karlapati family migrated from the Jaggiahpeta Village and settled down in the Madras province in the early 19th century and formed the "Apparao Gardens" in Madras. Karlapati Apparao, son of Zamindarini Karlapati Shayamalambha Devi and Karlapati Satyanarayana, headed many companies in Madras and Hyderabad which includes the Shyamala Industries Corporation, Subhodaya Publications which used to publish famous news papers such as "The Indian Republic", "Praja Patrika". The Subhodaya Publications used to be in the MountRoad, where the present V.S.T Motors and K.C.P Sugars stand today. The Shyamala Industries Corporation, with the head office in Hyderabad, used to have multiple companies under it which includes the TANA Shoe Factory, An Earthen Vase manufacturing company. Karlapati Satyendra Kumar, the eldest son of the Zamindar Karlapati Apparao, headed Kumar Cargo Industries, which used to salvage ships and run a boat building yard.

Zamindar Karlapati Apparao family 
The Apparao Gardens in Choolai is an 18-acre land which is centrally located in the old George Town closer to the Madras (Chennai) Central Station. It is where the Zamindar Karlapati Apparao's family reside, in a 200-year-old British bungalow (used to the old British Arms & Ammunitions House). The bungalow also houses a Naga Devatha Temple which is even older. The Zamindar Karlapati Apparao family owned a fleet of cars which include the "Rolls-Royce". The Zamindar Karlapati Apparao have seven sons and five daughters and their family who now own & take care of the family heritage and holdings.

Schools
 Govt. boys higher secondary school
 Govt. girls higher secondary school
 SBVM School
 Billabong high international school
 Vethathiri Maharishi Higher Secondary School
 Sri Ayyan Vidyashram Hr.Sec School

Temples
 Sundara raja Perumal Temple
 Visaleeswarar Temple (OLD TEMPLE AT AD 600) 
 Ponniyamman Temple
 Sundara Vinayagar Temple
 Anjaneya Temple
 தொட்டிச்சி அம்மன்
 
 Ellai amman temple (it is kuladeivam for Manikka, Sengothi, Kulsanaam, Kaalatheswarar Gotra of Sengunthar Kaikola Mudaliyar)

Churches
CSI Pastorate Village churches:
 CSI RK Pet Pudhur Church (Shanti Nilayam Campus), Estd. 1901 AD.

References

Villages in Tiruvallur district